William Harold Fritz (born Aug. 24, 1928, died June 9, 2009) was a geologist who worked for the Geological Survey of Canada. He is known for his work in stratigraphy and on olenelloid trilobites.

Biography
Fritz was born in Cathlamet, Washington, where his father practised medicine for over 50 years. He graduated from Wahkiakum High School in 1946. After Air Force service during the Korean War, he completed his PhD in Geology at the University of Washington in 1960. He first worked for the Shell Oil Company in Alaska, then in 1964 he moved to Canada taking up a position as a research geologist with the Geological Survey. After retiring he and his wife Judie carried out geological work in Nevada. They had one son, Peter.

Geological Work

Fritz's work focussed mostly on the Cambrian period. In 1966 and 1967 he, along with Judie and Peter as well as other geologists, spent two summers working on the Burgess Shale in the Canadian Rockies, discovered by Walcott in 1909. They found many soft-bodied fossils in the layers described by Walcott, expanding the existing collection, and also explored other sites in the area. Other early work, including that for his PhD, was carried out in the Great Basin, in Nevada. There was not much information available about the area of study, so much structural and stratigraphic surveying had to be done, as well as the analysis of the fossil material, largely trilobites. The work led to the identification of a number of new species of trilobites, of lower and middle Cambrian age, as well as two new genera

Most of Fritz's work was in the Canadian Cordillera, particularly in the Mackenzie Mountains. His interest in trilobites continued, and in 1972 he published a major taxonomic paper which identified three biostratigraphic zones in the lower Cambrian based on the characteristic trilobites they contain. These zones, Falotaspis, Nevadella and Bonnia-Olenellus are still in use. Fritz published many stratigraphic sections in north-western Canada, and several further taxonomic papers on trilobites 

Fritz was a member of the Precambrian-Cambrian Boundary Working Group. As well as work in Canada this involved visits to China and to Siberia.

After his retirement he returned to his old surveying area of the Great Basin, and continued to search for trilobites, with considerable success.

New Trilobite Genera erected by Fritz

Index species for each genus indicated in brackets

Achlysopsis (liokata)

Albertelloides (mischi)

Bonnima (semidiscoidea)

Bradyfallotaspis (fusa)

Cirquella (nummularia)

Ekwipagetia (plicofimbria)

Gabriellus (lanceatus)

Geraldinella (corneiliana)

Holmiella (preancora)

Illtydaspis (quartetensis)

Keeleaspis (gratia)

Mummaspis (occidens)

Nehanniaspis (prima)

Palmettaspis (consorta)

Parafallotaspis (grata)

Sekwiaspis (artifrons)

Variopelta (laevis)

Yukonides (lacrinus)

References

Selected Bibliography

</ref>

1928 births
2009 deaths
Canadian geologists
Geological Survey of Canada personnel
University of Washington alumni